"Linger" is a song by Irish alternative rock band the Cranberries from their debut studio album, Everybody Else Is Doing It, So Why Can't We? (1993). Composed by band members Dolores O'Riordan and Noel Hogan, and produced by Stephen Street, "Linger" was first released as the second and final single from the album on 15 February 1993 by Island Records. It was later re-released on 31 January 1994.

"Linger", which has an acoustic arrangement featuring a string section, became the band's first major hit, peaking at number 3 in their native Ireland, number 8 in the United States, and number 14 in the United Kingdom. The single remained on the US Billboard Hot 100 for 24 weeks. Additionally, "Linger" was voted by Australian Triple J listeners as number 3 on the Triple J Hottest 100, 1993 chart.

In 1990, "Linger" was released on a demo tape with "Dreams" in Ireland only in the summer of that year under their initial band name, the Cranberry Saw Us.
In 2017, an acoustic, stripped-down version of "Linger" was released as the lead single from the band's seventh studio album Something Else. "Linger" is written in the key of D major.

Background
When O'Riordan was auditioned as the lead singer for the band, she wrote the lyrics, turning it into a song of regret based on an experience with a 17-year-old soldier she once fell in love with. Drummer Fergal Lawler recalled the process in an interview, saying:

In the documentary '99 Love Life & Rock 'n' Roll, O'Riordan says that the song is about her first serious kiss.

"Linger" has since become one of the band's most famous songs, though O'Riordan noted that the band did not expect the song to reach the level of commercial success that it did. In a 2012 interview, O'Riordan commented, "I remember when MTV first put 'Linger' in heavy rotation, every time I walked into a diner or a hotel lobby, it was like, 'Jesus, man, here I am again'. It was trippy, like Jacob's Ladder. I didn't even have to take drugs".

In an interview for NME, guitarist Noel Hogan said of the song:

Critical reception
Jason Elias of AllMusic described "Linger" as "a song of regret, epic in scope and sweeping", praising the instrumentation and O'Riordan vocals: "While this isn't lyrically novel, the full-on emotionality of lead singer Dolores O'Riordan makes this stand out. Singing in a strong Irish brogue she comes off both needy and detached here. It's that emotion that powers this track". A reviewer from Music & Media wrote, "Currently on tour with the Hothouse Flowers, these fellow Irishmen deserve your attention. Don't hang round the bar, but move forwards to the stage to check out their alternative pop with shades of folk." Martin Aston from Music Week rated it four out of five, adding that it "combines a gorgeous, melting vocal from Dolores with a delicate folky melody." Another editor, Alan Jones, deemed it a "delightful single", noting that "floating in on a breeze, it has a haunting, fragile quality and an almost country feel." Amanda Petrusich of The New Yorker described the song as "a hazy, sentimental song about realizing that you're on the bummer end of a lopsided relationship". Tony Cross from Smash Hits gave it five out of five, naming it Best New Single. He added, "Delores O'Riordan's voice comes straight from the chill out room and oils the song's creaky form into fabulous, delicious and delicate motion. Settle back into an old leather sofa for a long, long time and let it linger." "Linger" was ranked at number 86 on Vh1's 100 Greatest Songs of the '90s.

Music video
The accompanying music video for "Linger", shot in grayscale, was directed by Melodie McDaniel and based loosely on Jean-Luc Godard's 1965 science fiction noir film Alphaville—a "film that considers the potency of desire". In one of the rooms of the hotel, a silent film is being shown which features 1950s stripper Blaze Starr.

"Linger" received heavy rotation on MTV in 1993.

Track listings

 UK 7-inch and cassette single
 "Linger" (album version) – 4:33
 "Reason" – 2:01

 UK 12-inch and CD single
 "Linger" (single version) – 4:33
 "Reason" – 2:01
 "How" (Radical mix) – 2:56

 US and Canadian CD single
 "Linger" – 4:34
 "Liar" – 2:21
 "Them" – 3:44
 "Reason" – 2:01

 US cassette single
 "Linger" – 4:34
 "How" – 2:51

 UK 7-inch and cassette single (1994)
 "Linger"
 "Pretty"

 UK 10-inch EP (1994)
A1. "Linger" (live at The Record Plant, Hollywood)
A2. "I Still Do" (live at The Record Plant, Hollywood)
B1. "Waltzing Back" (live at The Record Plant, Hollywood)
B2. "Pretty" (live at The Record Plant, Hollywood)

 UK CD single (1994)
 "Linger" (LP version) – 4:33
 "Pretty" – 2:16
 "Waltzing Back" (live at The Record Plant, Hollywood) – 4:01
 "Pretty" (live at The Record Plant, Hollywood) – 2:11

Personnel
 Dolores O'Riordan – vocals, acoustic guitar, keyboards
 Noel Hogan – lead guitar, backing vocals
 Mike Hogan – bass guitar
 Fergal Lawler – drums, percussion

Charts

Weekly charts

Year-end charts

Certifications

References

1990s ballads
1992 songs
1993 singles
2017 singles
Black-and-white music videos
The Cranberries songs
Island Records singles
Rock ballads
Song recordings produced by Stephen Street
Songs about heartache
Songs written by Dolores O'Riordan
Songs written by Noel Hogan